Hussein Bassir is an Egyptian archaeologist of Giza Pyramids and one of the directors (field director) of the excavation team in the Valley of the Golden Mummies at Bahariya Oasis. In 1994, he got his BA in Egyptology from Cairo University. In 2004, he got his MA in Near Eastern Studies from the Johns Hopkins University, Baltimore, Maryland, United States, where he currently conducts research as a doctoral candidate. He is also the author of several works of fiction in Arabic on ancient Egypt such as In Search For Khnum and The Old Red Hippopotamus. Bassir worked as a member of Dr Zahi Hawass' archaeological team alongside Justin Ellis and Gregory Peters while participating in many archaeological excavations in sites all over Egypt. His written works include commentaries on Arabic literature, Arabic cinema, Egyptology and Archaeology. He is currently a member of the Egyptian Supreme Council of Antiquities, Ministry of Culture.

Related links
 Al-Ahram Weekly: Losing Their Heads
 Hussein Bassir at the NG
 Al-Ahram Weekly: Face to face with the Golden Mummies
 Arab World Books Directory
 Excerpt from Hussein Bassir's novel: The Old Red Hippopotamus
 Article about Tutankhamun in Al Arabi Magazine

Year of birth missing (living people)
Living people
Egyptian archaeologists
Egyptian Egyptologists
Egyptian novelists
Cairo University alumni
Johns Hopkins University alumni